Empire Stadium was the name of three stadiums:

 Empire Stadium (Vancouver), Vancouver, Canada, now closed
 Empire Stadium (Gżira), Malta, now closed
 Wembley Stadium (1923), Wembley, England, originally called Empire Exhibition Stadium later renamed Wembley Stadium, replaced in 2007 by a new Wembley Stadium